In petrophysics, Archie's law relates the in-situ electrical conductivity (C) of a porous rock to its porosity and fluid saturation of the pores:
 

 

Reformulated for the electrical resistivity (R), the inverse of the electrical conductivity , the equation reads

The factor

The porosity being saturated with the fluid (often water), . 

In case the fluid filling the porosity is a mixture of water and hydrocarbon (petroleum, oil, gas), a resistivity index can be defined:
 

Where  is the resistivity of the rock saturated in water only.

It is a purely empirical law attempting to describe ion flow (mostly sodium and chloride) in clean, consolidated sands, with varying intergranular porosity. Electrical conduction is only performed by ions dissolved in aqueous solution. So, electrical conduction is considered to be absent in the rock grains of the solid phase or in organic fluids other than water (oil, hydrocarbon, gas).

Archie's law is named after Gus Archie (1907–1978) who developed this empirical quantitative relationship between porosity, electrical conductivity, and fluid saturation of rocks. Archie's law laid the foundation for modern well log interpretation as it relates borehole electrical conductivity measurements to hydrocarbon saturations (which, for fluid saturated rock, equals ).

Parameters

Cementation exponent, m

The cementation exponent models how much the pore network increases the resistivity, as the rock itself is assumed to be non-conductive. If the pore network were to be modelled as a set of parallel capillary tubes, a cross-section area average of the rock's resistivity would yield porosity dependence equivalent to a cementation exponent of 1. However, the tortuosity of the rock increases this to a higher number than 1. This relates the cementation exponent to the permeability of the rock, increasing permeability decreases the cementation exponent.

The exponent  has been observed near 1.3 for unconsolidated sands, and is believed to increase with cementation. Common values for this cementation exponent for consolidated sandstones are 1.8 <  < 2.0.
In carbonate rocks, the cementation exponent shows higher variance due to strong diagenetic affinity and complex pore structures. Values between 1.7 and 4.1 have been observed.

The cementation exponent is usually assumed not to be dependent on temperature.

Saturation exponent, n
The saturation exponent  usually is fixed to values close to 2. The saturation exponent models the dependency on the presence of non-conductive fluid (hydrocarbons) in the pore-space, and is related to the wettability of the rock. Water-wet rocks will, for low water saturation values, maintain a continuous film along the pore walls making the rock conductive. Oil-wet rocks will have discontinuous droplets of water within the pore space, making the rock less conductive.

Tortuosity factor, a

The constant , called the tortuosity factor,  cementation intercept, lithology factor or, lithology coefficient is sometimes used. It is meant to correct for variation in compaction, pore structure and grain size.
The parameter  is called the tortuosity factor and is related to the path length of the current flow. The value lies in the range 0.5 to 1.5, and it may be different in different reservoirs. However a typical value to start with for a sandstone reservoir might be 0.6, which then can be tuned during log data matching process with other sources of data such as core.

Measuring the exponents

In petrophysics, the only reliable source for the numerical value of both exponents is experiments on sand plugs from cored wells. The fluid electrical conductivity can be measured directly on produced fluid (groundwater) samples. Alternatively, the fluid electrical conductivity and the cementation exponent can also be inferred from downhole electrical conductivity measurements across fluid-saturated intervals. For fluid-saturated intervals Archie's law can be written
 

Hence, plotting the logarithm of the measured in-situ electrical conductivity against the logarithm of the measured in-situ porosity (Pickett plot), according to Archie's law a straight-line relationship is expected with slope equal to the cementation exponent  and intercept equal to the logarithm of the in-situ fluid electrical conductivity.

Sands with clay/shaly sands

Archie's law postulates that the rock matrix is non-conductive. For sandstone with clay minerals, this assumption is no longer true in general, due to the clay's structure and cation exchange capacity.  The Waxman–Smits equation is one model that tries to correct for this.

See also
Birch's law
Byerlee's law

References

 
 
 

Geophysics
Equations
Well logging